Vusimuzi "Vusi" Sibanda (born 10 October 1983) is a Zimbabwean cricketer. He has played international cricket for the Zimbabwe cricket team in all three formats of the game. He also played for Midlands in the Logan Cup.

Early career
Sibanda is a right-handed opening batsman and showed potential as a teenager, graduating from the Zimbabwe Cricket Academy and being fast-tracked into the national team.

He grew up in Highfields, Harare and was spotted early on by developmental coaches, and earned a scholarship to Churchill Boys High.
He currently plays domestic cricket for Mid West Rhinos

International career
He made his ODI debut in 2003 against the West Indies and made 58. Sibanda however struggled at international level from there on in, not scoring another half century for 18 innings, making at one stage 3 consecutive ducks.

In May 2005 his place in the national team came under threat by the imminent return of the 'rebel' Zimbabwean cricketers who walked out on the team in a dispute with Zimbabwe Cricket. The return was unsuccessful and Sibanda again became a regular at the top of the order for Zimbabwe, making his maiden ODI hundred in 2006 against Bermuda in the Caribbean Tri Nations Tournament.

He made a return to international cricket (although he denied ever retiring ) for the Africa XI in the 2007 Afro-Asia Cup. He played in two of the three ODIs, scoring 80 runs at an average of 40.00. Although Sibanda wasn't playing initially in the 2011 Cricket World Cup and injury to Sean Williams meant a call-up for him. He scored 61 off 57 balls in an innings that included 7 fours. Zimbabwe reached 308/6.

Sibanda was included to the 2016 ICC World Twenty20 for Zimbabwe as the opening batsman with skipper Hamilton Masakadza. He scored his maiden T20I fifty of 59 from 54 balls against Hong Kong on 8 March 2016, during first match of group B in qualifying round. Zimbabwe won the match by 14 runs and Sibanda won man of the match award as well.

Career summary

Tests 
Test Debut: vs West Indies, Harare, 2003–2004
Latest Test: vs New Zealand, Bulawayo, 2011–2012
Sibanda's best Test score of 93 was made against New Zealand, Harare, 2011.

One-day internationals 
ODI Debut: vs West Indies, Bulawayo, 2003–2004
Latest ODI: vs Asia XI, Chennai, 2007
Sibanda's best ODI score of 116
His best ODI bowling figures of 1 for 12 came against England, Birmingham, ICC Champions Trophy 2004

References

External links
Cricinfo page on Vusi Sibanda
HowSTAT! statistical profile on Vusi Sibanda

Zimbabwe One Day International cricketers
Zimbabwe Test cricketers
Zimbabwe Twenty20 International cricketers
Zimbabwean cricketers
ACA African XI One Day International cricketers
CFX Academy cricketers
Midlands cricketers
1983 births
Living people
Cricketers at the 2007 Cricket World Cup
Cricketers at the 2011 Cricket World Cup
Mid West Rhinos cricketers